SS Mahratta was a Brocklebank Line steamship launched in 1917. She ran aground in the English Channel on the Goodwin Sands in October 1939. She was the second and final Brocklebank Line ship with this name. The first Mahratta suffered a similar fate in 1909. After Mahratta broke up, the ship was found to be resting on top of the first Mahratta.

History
SS Mahratta was launched on 20 October 1917. Its name is an old spelling of Maratha. On 6 April 1936, SS Matheran lost her propeller off Port Sudan.

Shipwreck

On 9 October 1939, Mahratta was inbound to London from Calcutta when she ran aground on the Goodwins. Mahratta had originally been bound for Liverpool but received new orders at Gibraltar to sail to London. Mahratta left Gibraltar as part of Convoy HG 1 on 26 September 1939.  In blackout conditions she ran aground on Fork Spit, less than a mile away from where the first Mahratta had run aground. The Deal hoveller Lady Haig was given charge of the salvage operations. A tug attempted to move Mahratta into deeper water the next day, but the plates on her port side buckled and by nightfall Mahratta had broken in two. The crew of Mahratta were transferred to the steamer Challenge in four trips. On the third trip, a lifeboat full of luggage salvaged from Mahratta was taken in tow, but a large wave almost capsized Lady Haig and the lifeboat was cast adrift after the ten crew from Mahratta on it were rescued.  They were landed at Dover.

Pride of Canterbury ferry incident
On 31 January 2008, the roll on roll off passenger ferry Pride of Canterbury operated by P&O Ferries struck the wreck of Mahratta while manoeuvring in severe weather into a holding position in The Downs. The ferry suffered extensive damage to her port propeller and had to be assisted to berth in Dover. It is not clear whether the wreck site named in the MAIB report is that of the first SS Mahratta or the later vessel.

References

External links
Lloyds Register entry

 

Shipwrecks in the Downs
Maritime incidents in October 1939
Merchant ships of the United Kingdom
1917 ships